Adrian Taihia (born 3 September 1983) is a retired New Zealand professional boxer. Taihia is in Craig Thomson's Boxing Stable.

Australian Contender
Taihia took part in The Contender Australia, a reality television show based on the sport of boxing. The show practically was a fourteen-man tournament with boxers hailing from Australia and New Zealand. Unfortunately Taihia didn't make it through to the next round.

Taihia vs Jackson
Taihia has fought Gunnar Jackson twice in their professional boxing career. Both boxers are under the same boxing stable, which is owned by Craig Thomson. Both bouts were for the NZPBA Super Middleweight title. The first bout ended in a Majority Decision Draw with two judges in favour of a draw and the last judge in favour of Jackson. The second bout Taihia won the title by Unanimous Decision. The vacant World Boxing Federation Oceania title was also on the line.

Berridge rivalry
Taihia has had a long rivalry with Robert Berridge. Both fights started their boxing career around the same time as each other and both have climbed the ranks. It has been dubbed by the New Zealand public a dream fight in the light heavyweight division. Taihia has agreed to fight Berridge multiple times, however Berridge has always pulled out, either due to injury or promoter negotiation issues. The rivalry got even more person when Taihia entered the ring during a Berridge post fight interview. The two fought on 28 October 2016 with Taihia losing by Unanimous Decision. After the fight, Taihia announced on his Facebook that he retired from boxing. Taihia stated he felt robbed and lost the passion for the sport.

Controversy
In July 2014, Taihia was arrested on drug charges. Originally Taihia was charged with counts of manufacturing methamphetamine and single charges of conspiracy to manufacture methamphetamine, supply of methamphetamine and participation in an organised criminal group. Those charges came after a 12-month covert police operation which ended in November 2012. The charges carried a maximum penalty of life imprisonment. He pleaded guilty mid-trial to one amalgamated charge of being a party to manufacture with the other charges dropped. In November 2014 he was sentenced to two-and-a-half years in prison, however he was released on parole in December 2015 with permission to fight in the ring. Many of his family and friends has stated that this was out of character. His lawyer Peter Winter said Taihia's offending was not out of greed, but due to an obligation-based situation where he wanted to pay for his mother-in-law's funeral, but was not able to due to a shortage of cash.

Professional boxing titles
New Zealand Professional Boxing Association 
 New Zealand National super middleweight title (2013)
World Boxing Federation 
WBF Oceania super middleweight title (2013)
World Boxing Association  
 Interim PABA light heavyweight title (2014)
World Boxing Union 
WBU Inter-Continental light heavyweight title (2014)

Professional boxing record

References

External links
 

1982 births
New Zealand professional boxing champions
Living people
New Zealand criminals
Boxers from Auckland
Niuean male boxers
New Zealand people of Niuean descent
New Zealand male boxers
Super-middleweight boxers
Light-heavyweight boxers
The Contender (TV series) participants